, also the Kurodani Temple, is a Buddhist temple in Kyoto, Japan. It is one of Head Temple of the Jōdo Sect of Buddhism.

The graves of Aizu and Kuwana men who died at the Battle of Toba–Fushimi are located at this temple.

External links
 Temple website
 Temple_website

Buddhist temples in Kyoto
Important Cultural Properties of Japan
Pure Land temples